The 1947 North Texas State Teachers Eagles football team represented the North Texas State Teachers College (later renamed the University of North Texas) as a member of the Lone Star Conference (LSC) during the 1947 college football season.  In its second season under head coach Odus Mitchell, the team compiled a 10–2 record (6–0 against LSC opponents), won the LSC championship, and lost to Nevada in the 1948 Salad Bowl. The team played its home games at Eagle Field in Denton, Texas.

Schedule

References

North Texas State Teachers
North Texas Mean Green football seasons
Lone Star Conference football champion seasons
North Texas State Teachers Eagles football